Amyna is a genus of moths of the family Noctuidae erected by Achille Guenée in 1852.

Description
Their thoraxes are tuftless. The abdomen is slender and tapering to a point with the slight dorsal tufts. Palpi more slender and reaching above vertex of head. Forewings are shorter and broader, where the costa more arched towards apex.

Species

References

Eustrotiinae
Noctuoidea genera